

Buildings and structures

Buildings

 The Drum, Edinburgh, designed by William Adam.
 Loboc Church, Philippines.
 Louisbourg Lighthouse, Nova Scotia.
 Potsdam Gate, Berlin.
 San Giuseppe alla Lungara, Rome, designed by Ludovico Rusconi Sassi.
 Schloss Nordkirchen, North Rhine-Westphalia.
 Sivasagar Sivadol Hindu temples, Sivasagar, Assam.
 Rebuilding of Wentworth Woodhouse in the north of England begins.

Publications
 Palladio Londinensis: or, The London art of building.

Births
 May 7 – James Byres, Scottish architect (d. 1817)
 July 18 – Giuseppe Piermarini, Italian architect (d. 1808)
 October 6 (bapt.) – Joseph Pickford, English architect (d. 1782)
 William Buckland, English-born American architect (d. 1774)

Deaths
 March 1 – Roger North, English lawyer, biographer and amateur of the arts (b. 1651)
 May – Alexander McGill, Scottish architect (b. c.1680)
 William Etty, English architect (b. c.1675)

References 

Architecture
Years in architecture
18th-century architecture